The Female Brain is a book written by the American neuropsychiatrist Louann Brizendine in 2006. The main thesis of the book is that women's behavior is different from that of men due, in large measure, to hormonal differences. Brizendine says that the human female brain is affected by the following hormones: estrogen, progesterone, testosterone, oxytocin, neurotransmitters (dopamine, serotonin), and that there are differences in the architecture of the brain (prefrontal cortex, hypothalamus, amygdala) that regulates such hormones and neurotransmitters.

Structure
The Female Brain has seven chapters, each one of which is dedicated to a specific part of a woman's life such as puberty, motherhood, and menopause, or a specific dimension of a women's emotional life such as feelings, love and trust, and sex. The book also includes three appendices on hormone therapy, postpartum depression, and sexual orientation.

Reception 
The book sold well but received mixed reviews, because a number of journalists, popular science writers, and scientists questioned the validity of some of the content.

Some of the authors that supported the content of the book include:
 Deborah Tannen, of The Washington Post Tannen writes, "Throughout the book, I recognized biological accounts for social behaviors I had observed and written about." In a similar vein, she adds, "Anthropologists and linguists who have studied children at play have noted that girls form bonds by telling secrets. Here, too, Brizendine finds 'a biological reason.'" Her ultimate position is one of cautionary endorsement: "Ideally, readers will sift through the case studies, research findings and scientific conjectures gathered in this non-technical book and be intrigued by some while questioning others, bearing in mind the caution that hormones and brain structure play a role in gender differences but are not the whole story." 
 Sarah Hrdy, author of Mother Nature
 Daniel Goleman, journalist and author of Emotional Intelligence

Some of the authors that criticized the content of the book include:
 Evan Balaban, professor of psychology at McGill University, and Rebecca Jordan-Young, in a review in Nature.
 Cordelia Fine, in her book Delusions of Gender.
Benjamin Radford.
Robin Marantz Henig in The New York Times.
Mark Liberman in a series of articles via his Language Log blog.

Brizendine was given the tongue-in-cheek 2006 Becky Award, for "outstanding contributions to linguistic misinformation". The award cited errors in The Female Brain, including one sentence (removed from subsequent printings) which contrasted the number of words used by men and women in one day. The numbers had been taken from a book by a self-help guru and were incorrect.

Response to criticisms 
Brizendine later made some concessions to those who felt that this book overemphasised gender-based differences, saying in 2010: "The male and female brain are mostly alike. We are the same species after all".

In other media 

The Female Brain was loosely adapted as a romantic comedy movie of the same name in 2017. Brizendine served as the inspiration for the film's main character.

See also
Biology of gender
Brain Gender
Brain Sex

References

External links
 The Female Brain reviewed in "50 Psychology Classics" by Tom Butler-Bowdon

2006 non-fiction books
Neuroscience books
Women's studies